The Democratic Socialist Party (DSP) was a small left-wing political party in the Republic of Ireland. The party was formed by a merger of Jim Kemmy's Limerick Socialist Organisation and the Socialist Party of Ireland. Jim Kemmy was an Irish politician and member of Dáil Éireann. He left the Labour Party in 1972. A number of members of the British and Irish Communist Organisation also joined the party.

History 
The Democratic Socialist Party was founded in 1982. It had a political stance to the left of the Labour Party, and was strongly opposed to nationalist positions regarding Northern Ireland. Journalist Brian Trench claimed the DSP shared "the anti-republicanism and economism" of the 1980s Workers' Party, despite disagreeing with the WP on other issues. In 1983 the party made submissions to the New Ireland Forum reflecting its non-nationalist position. It also held a strongly secularist position, opposing the influence of the Catholic Church on issues such as contraception, divorce and abortion.

The party never held any Dáil seats other than Kemmy's seat in Limerick East. Outside of Limerick City its membership was very small, although its positions on Northern Ireland and the Catholic Church attracted members of the British and Irish Communist Organisation (BICO) to it. In 1982, the Socialist Party of Ireland joined.

It merged with the Labour Party in May 1990. Many of the BICO members in the party later joined the Democratic Left when that party was established in 1992.

A number of former members became successful electorally with the Labour Party such as Limerick TD Jan O'Sullivan, Dublin TD Michael Conaghan who was Lord Mayor of Dublin in 2004 and TD Eamonn Maloney. The historian John de Courcy Ireland was also a member of the party and a candidate in the 1984 European elections.

List of the DSP electoral candidates

General election results

Local elections

References 

1972 establishments in Ireland
1990 disestablishments in Ireland
Anti-nationalist parties
Defunct political parties in the Republic of Ireland
Democratic socialist parties in Europe
Political parties disestablished in 1990
Political parties established in 1972
Secularism in Ireland
Socialist parties in Ireland